Pechipogo is a genus of moths of the family Erebidae. The genus was erected by Jacob Hübner in 1825.

Lepidoptera and Some Other Life Forms and Butterflies and Moths of the World consider this name to be a synonym of Polypogon.

Species
Pechipogo plumigeralis Hübner, [1825]
Pechipogo simplicicornis Zerny, 1935
Pechipogo strigilata Linnaeus, 1758

References

Herminiinae